Popiah Pictures is a television drama, reality TV and production house from Malaysia. Founded by Anne Low and award-winning film director Ng Ping Ho, the company has produced numerous programmes for television stations such as TV3, ntv7 and 8TV.

Productions
Getting Together (2000)
Each Other (2002) TV Series
Kopitiam (1997) TV Series - 7 seasons
Table For Two (2004) TV Series
Realiti (2006) TV Series
The Firm (2007) TV Series
The Firm (Season 1) (2007)
The Firm (Season 2) (2008)
Ghost (2008) TV Series
10 (2009) TV mini-series

References
 Azmi, Dzof (Feb 8, 2008) A ghostly glimmer of hope. The Star. Retrieved May 18, 20098.
 (Aug 24, 2006) New drama series on reality TV shows. The Star. Retrieved Jun 27, 2007.
 Maizura, Intan (Jun 27, 2007). Peep!: At home in the office. Sunday People. Retrieved Jun 27, 2007.

External links
 Official website

Television production companies of Malaysia
Film production companies of Malaysia
Privately held companies of Malaysia